Millmoor Juniors Ladies Football Club is an English women's football club based in Kimberworth, Rotherham, South Yorkshire. The club currently play in the North East Regional Women's Football League Southern Division.

History

Season by season record

References

External links
Official site

Women's football clubs in England
Football clubs in South Yorkshire
Sheffield & Hallamshire County FA members